Behdan may refer to:
 Behdan, Gilan
 Behdan, South Khorasan
 Behdan, Yazd